A general election was held in the U.S. state of Wyoming on November 6, 2018. All of Wyoming's executive offices were up for election, as well as a United States Senate seat and Wyoming's at-large seat in the United States House of Representatives. Primary elections were held on August 21, 2018.

Governor

Incumbent Republican Governor Matt Mead was term-limited and could not run for a third term. Republican State Treasurer Mark Gordon defeated attorney Harriet Hageman, businessmen Bill Dahlin, Foster Friess, Sam Galeotos, and physician Taylor Haynes.

Former Democratic Minority Leader of the Wyoming House of Representatives Mary Throne ran for the Democratic nomination with minimal opposition.

Results

Secretary of State

Ed Murray, who had first been elected in 2014, intended to run for governor, but resigned February 9, 2018 following claims of sexual assault. Governor Matt Mead appointed former Speaker of the Wyoming House of Representatives Edward Buchanan to fill the remainder of Murray's term.

Republican primary

Candidates
Edward Buchanan, incumbent Secretary of State of Wyoming and former Speaker of the Wyoming House of Representatives

Withdrew
Leland Christensen, State Senator and candidate for the U.S. House of Representatives in 2016 (running for State Treasurer)

Democratic primary

Candidates
James W. Byrd, state representative

General election

Predictions

Results

State Treasurer

Incumbent Republican State Treasurer Mark Gordon declined to run for a third full term and instead ran successfully for Governor of Wyoming.

Republican primary

Candidates
Leland Christensen, State Senator and candidate for the U.S. House of Representatives in 2016
Curt Meier, state senator
Ron Redo, candidate for State Treasurer in 2014

Democratic primary

Candidates
No candidate filed to run; however, Chris Lowry qualified for the general election by receiving enough sufficient write-in votes.

Results

State Auditor

Incumbent Republican State Auditor Cynthia Cloud declined to run for a third term.

Republican primary

Candidates
Kristi Racines, certified public accountant
Nathan Winters, state representative

Democratic primary

Candidates
Jeff Dockter, Wyoming Department of Enterprise Technology Services supervisor

Results

Superintendent of Public Instruction

Incumbent Republican Superintendent Jillian Balow ran for a second term.

Republican primary

Candidates
 Jillian Balow, incumbent Superintendent of Public Instruction

Results

United States Senate

Incumbent Republican Senator John Barrasso ran for a third term.

Businessman and nominee for the U.S. House of Representatives in 2006 and 2008 Gary Trauner ran for the Democratic nomination. 

Businessman Dave Dodson initially ran as an independent, but later ran in the Republican primary and was defeated.

United States House of Representatives

Incumbent Republican U.S. Representative Liz Cheney, who had represented the state in the United States House of Representatives since 2017, successfully ran for reelection. She defeated Rod Miller, a former federal land planning coordinator, and Blake Stanley for the Republican nomination. 

Oil geologist Greg Hunter defeated attorney Travis Helm for the Democratic nomination.

State Legislature

Wyoming Senate

Of the 30 seats in the Wyoming Senate, 15 were up for election in 2018.

Wyoming House of Representatives

All 60 seats in the Wyoming House of Representatives were up for election in 2018.

References

External links
Candidates at Vote Smart  
Candidates at Ballotpedia 
Campaign finance at OpenSecrets

Official Secretary of State campaign websites
Ed Buchanan (R) for Secretary of State
James W. Byrd (D) for Secretary of State
Kit Carson (L) for Secretary of State 

Official Treasurer campaign websites
Chris Lowry (D) for Treasurer
Curt Meier (R) for Treasurer 

Official Auditor campaign websites
Jeff Dockter (D) for Auditor
Kristi Racines (R) for Auditor

Official Superintendent of Public Instruction campaign websites
Jillian Balow (R) for Superintendent